Brantley David Starr (born 1979) is a United States district judge of the United States District Court for the Northern District of Texas.

Biography 

Starr received his Bachelor of Arts, summa cum laude, from Abilene Christian University, and earned his Juris Doctor from the University of Texas School of Law. After graduating from law school, he was a law clerk to then-Justice Don Willett of the Supreme Court of Texas. Starr then served as a staff attorney to Justice Eva Guzman of the Supreme Court of Texas, and then worked as an Assistant Attorney General, Assistant Solicitor General, and Deputy Attorney General for Legal Counsel, all in the office of the Attorney General of Texas. From 2016 to 2019 he served as the Deputy First Assistant Attorney General of Texas, under Jeff Mateer.

Federal judicial service 

On March 8, 2019, President Donald Trump announced his intent to nominate Starr to serve as a United States District Judge of the United States District Court for the Northern District of Texas. On March 11, 2019, President Trump nominated Starr to the seat vacated by Judge Sidney A. Fitzwater, who assumed senior status on September 22, 2018. On April 10, 2019, a hearing on his nomination was held before the Senate Judiciary Committee. On May 9, 2019, his nomination was reported out of committee by a 12–10 vote. On July 30, 2019, the Senate voted 51–37 to invoke cloture on his nomination. On July 31, 2019, his nomination was confirmed by a 51–39 vote. He received his judicial commission on August 6, 2019.

Memberships 

He has been a member of the Federalist Society since 2005.

References

External links 
 

1979 births
Living people
21st-century American lawyers
21st-century American judges
Abilene Christian University alumni
Federalist Society members
Judges of the United States District Court for the Northern District of Texas
People from San Antonio
Texas lawyers
Texas Republicans
United States district court judges appointed by Donald Trump
University of Texas School of Law alumni